Echo Star Helstrom (1942–2018) was Bob Dylan’s high-school girlfriend in Hibbing, Minnesota. She met Dylan (then Bob Zimmerman) in 11th grade, and they were romantically involved for about one year. She was an influence on Dylan's development during his teen years in Hibbing, was a source for information on Dylan's early years, and may have inspired one or more of his songs.

Early years in Hibbing
Helstrom was a free-spirited blonde from the poorer outskirts of town, compared to the middle-class Zimmermans. She was the third child of Matt Helstrom and his wife Martha; Matt Helstrom was a mechanic, painter and welder. Echo Helstrom had a brother and a sister, but they were 14 and 15 years older than her. Zimmerman and Helstrom were a couple in 1957 and 1958, and went to the junior prom together.

In his memoir Chronicles: Volume One, Dylan refers to Helstrom (not by name but by clear inference) as "...my Becky Thatcher". In Chronicles, Dylan also writes "Everyone said she looked like Brigitte Bardot, and she did", and Dylan stated in a 1961 interview "I dedicated my first song to Brigitte Bardot." And at one of Dylan’s first public performances, in his high school auditorium, he sang a song beginning "I got a girl and her name is Echo..."

Dylan and Helstrom together listened to rhythm-and-blues coming from long-distance radio stations in Chicago, Little Rock, and Shreveport. Dylan also recounts in Chronicles that "One of the reasons I’d go [to Helstrom’s house]... was that they had old Jimmie Rodgers records, old 78s in the house." Helstrom herself recounted "[H]e had my father's huge collection of bound folk music to peruse. He'd sit for hours leafing through old manuscripts, sheet music and folk magazines".

Dylan biographer Toby Thompson formed a good friendship with Helstrom, who was a major source for Thompson's book Positively Main Street: Bob Dylan's Minnesota.

Girl from the North Country
Helstrom has been frequently cited as the inspiration for Dylan’s classic folk ballad "Girl from the North Country". Although commonly rumored, discussed, and by some believed likely, this identification is speculative. Bonnie Beecher, Suze Rotolo, and others have also been suggested as candidates for the song's subject, or the song may have not been inspired by any particular person.

Toby Thompson avers that Helstrom is probably the Girl, and Dylan expert John Bushey, longtime host of the Minneapolis radio show "Highway 61 Revisited", also leans to Helstrom. Clinton Heylin ( Revolution in the Air: The Songs of Bob Dylan, Vol. 1: 1957–73) is skeptical, saying that Helstrom "laid it on thick" for Thompson, but cites evidence on both sides of the question (Heylin acknowledges that Dylan did introduce "Girl From the North Country" at a 1978 show with "First girl I ever loved is in the house tonight, I wrote a song about her..." when Helstrom was apparently indeed in attendance, but provides also some contrary indicators), while Robert Shelton (No Direction Home: The Life and Music of Bob Dylan), favors Bonnie Beecher as the Girl. 

Dylan, when asked point-blank in 1986 if Helstrom was the Girl, characteristically prevaricated with an answer of only "Well, she's a north country girl through and through".

Dylan expert Michael Gray averred in The Bob Dylan Encyclopedia that in his opinion Helstrom was likely, at least in part, an inspiration for Dylan's song "Hazel".

Later life
Helstrom later moved to Minneapolis, where she worked as a booker for National General Pictures; there she was married briefly (her married name was Echo Helstrom Casey) and had a daughter, then in the 1970s moved to Los Angeles where she worked as a secretary at movie studios.

Helstrom had health problems including chronic fatigue syndrome and died in California in 2018.

References

Bob Dylan
Muses
People from Hibbing, Minnesota
1942 births
2018 deaths